Ivan Lacusta is a Moldovan-Romanian football player who currently is playing for Bredaryd Lanna IK

Career

Club career
In August 2018, Lacusta joined Polish III liga club Stal Brzeg. However, he was forced to leave the team due to the lacking of some documents, which meant that he was forced to leave the team by the end of the year. In 2019, Lacusta moved to Swedish club Anderstorps IF. He played 20 games in the Swedish 3rd Division and scores nine goals.

On 1 March 2020, Lacusta returned to Moldova and joined FC Codru Lozova. One year later, in March 2021, Lacusta moved to FC Fălești. In the summer 2021, he began playing for fellow league club FC Speranța Drochia.

References

External links
 moldova.sports.md
 

1995 births
Living people
Moldovan footballers
Moldovan expatriate footballers
Association football forwards
CSF Bălți players
FC Sfîntul Gheorghe players
FC Spicul Chișcăreni players
Anderstorps IF players
FC Codru Lozova players
Moldovan Super Liga players
III liga players
Moldovan expatriate sportspeople in Poland
Moldovan expatriate sportspeople in Sweden
Expatriate footballers in Poland
Expatriate footballers in Sweden